The Pawnee City Carnegie Library is a historic building in Pawnee City, Nebraska, and a Carnegie library. Its construction was initially rejected by the voters of Pawnee City in 1905, despite the promise of a $7,000 donation from Andrew Carnegie. It was built in 1908, and designed in the Classical Revival architectural style. It has been listed on the National Register of Historic Places since December 10, 2010.

It was designed by the Eisentraut-Colby-Pottenger Company of Sioux City, Iowa.  It is nearly square, being  in plan, and has brick exterior walls with a yellow brick veneer laid in running bond on three sides.

References

National Register of Historic Places in Pawnee County, Nebraska
Neoclassical architecture in Nebraska
Library buildings completed in 1908
Carnegie libraries in Nebraska